The Chalybes  and Chaldoi were peoples mentioned by classical authors as living in Pontus and Cappadocia in northern Anatolia during Classical Antiquity. Their territory was known as Chaldia, extending from the Halys River to Pharnakeia and Trabzon in the east and as far south as eastern Anatolia. According to Apollonius of Rhodes, the Chalybes were Scythians.

The Chaldoi, Chalybes, Mossynoikoi, and Tibareni, are counted among the first ironsmith nations by classical authors. Sayce derived the Greek name  from Hittite , "land of Halys River". More than an identifiable people or tribe, "Chalybes" was a generic Greek term for "peoples of the Black Sea coast who trade in iron" or "a group of specialised metalworkers". 

The main sources for the history of the Chaldoi are accounts from classical authors, including Homer, Strabo, and Xenophon. In Xenophon's Cyropaedia, Cyrus the Great helps the Armenians and Chaldians resolve a dispute over agricultural land.

In Roman times, the Chaldaei (homonymous but unrelated to the Semitic Chaldeans) and Chalybes are mentioned by Plutarch (Lucull. c. 14) as settled in  Pontus and Cappadocia, or the Pontus Cappadocicus section of the Roman province of Pontus.

Pliny the Elder mentioned the Armenochalybes, a tribe residing between Trebizond and Armenia. 

Despite the ancient Greeks connecting the Chalybes to Scythians, some modern historians argue the Chalybes were a Georgian tribe. Historian Kalistrat Salia claims the Georgian ethnicity of the Chalybes is "indisputable". According to Sallia, the Zans, a Kartvelian ethnic group from present-day Turkey, are their descendants. However, the one surviving word from the Chaldian language, Kakamar (the Chaldian name for the Black Sea), points toward an Indo-European connection.

See also
 Halizones

References

Bibliography
 Giorgi Leon Kavtaradze: Probleme der historischen Geographie Anatoliens und Transkaukasiens im ersten Jahrtausend v. Chr., in: Orbis Terrarum 2 (1996) S. 191-216 
  David Marshall Lang,  Грузины. Хранители святынь, Москва. Центрполиграф, 2006. pp. 71–72

Ancient peoples of Anatolia
Iron Age Anatolia
Tribes in Greco-Roman historiography
Anabasis (Xenophon)